Noah Lyles (born July 18, 1997) is an American professional track and field sprinter competing in the 100 meters and 200 meters. He is the 2020 Tokyo Olympic 200 m bronze medalist and a two-time World champion, having won the event at the 2019 and 2022 World Athletics Championships. At these Championships Lyles also earned gold and silver medal in the 4 × 100 m relay respectively. He holds personal bests of 9.86 seconds for the 100 m and 19.31 seconds for the 200 m, the latter being an American record making him the third fastest on the respective world all-time list.

Lyles won a gold medal in the 200 m during the 2014 Youth Olympic Games. He won gold medals for the 100 m and 4 × 100 m relay during the 2016 World U20 Championships. He is a five-time Diamond League champion, including one 100 m and four 200 m titles.

Early life
Lyles was a gymnast as a youth and started track and field at 12 years of age. His parents Keisha Caine and Kevin Lyles competed in track and field at Seton Hall University. He attended T. C. Williams High School (now Alexandria City High School) in Alexandria, Virginia.

Early career
Lyles represented the United States at the 2014 Youth Olympic Games where he won a gold medal in the 200 m.

In January 2015, Lyles cleared  in the high jump as a high school junior. In November 2015, he was named 2015 high school boys athlete of the year by Track & Field News.

In March 2016, Lyles won the 200 m at the New Balance Nationals Indoor. In April 2016, he won both the 100 m and 200 m at the 2016 Arcadia Invitational, setting new meeting records of 10.17 s and 20.48 s respectively. In June 2016, Lyles won the 100 m in 10.08 s at the USA Junior Championships.

In July 2016, Lyles went to the U.S. Olympic Trials to compete for spots on the Olympic team in the 100 m and the 200 m. He failed to advance from his first 100 m heat, but in the 200 m he won his semi-final and then placed fourth in the final with a time of 20.09 s, breaking a 31-year-old national high school record. Though he didn't qualify for the 2016 Summer Olympics, he qualified for the 2016 World U20 Championships where he was a double gold medalist, taking the 100 m and  relay titles.

Professional
Lyles had committed to compete for the Florida Gators at the University of Florida, but in July 2016, Noah and his younger brother Josephus instead turned professional and signed with adidas. In November 2016, Lyles was again named high school boys athlete of the year for 2016 by Track & Field News.

Lyles started 2017 with his first senior national title in the 300 m at the 2017 USA Indoor Championships in the thin air of Albuquerque, New Mexico, improving the indoor world record by one hundredth of a second to 31.87 s. He earned a silver medal in the 4 × 200-meter relay with team USA at the 2017 World Relays. Lyles won two meets in the 2017 IAAF Diamond League circuit, winning the final ahead of American champion Ameer Webb and world champion Ramil Guliyev. However, injuries prevented him from competing much of the season and he missed the 2017 World Championships as a result.

2018

Lyles returned to Albuquerque to compete at the 2018 USA Indoor Championships, but in the 60-meter dash instead of the 300 m. He made it through his first heat while equaling his personal best time of 6.57 s, but failed to advance through his semi-final. Having failed to make the national team for the 2018 World Indoor Championships, he turned his focus to preparing for the outdoor season. He opened with a win in the 200 m at the IAAF Diamond League Doha meet, setting a new personal best with a time of 19.83 s. A few weeks later he ran the less common 150 m at the adidas Boston Games, winning in a personal best time of 14.77 s. He returned to the 200 m at the IAAF Diamond League in Eugene, winning and improving his personal best time to 19.69 s. This time matched the world leading time set by Clarence Munyai earlier that year.

At the 2018 USA Championships he focused on the 100 m instead, matching the world lead of 9.89 s in the semi-final. Mike Rodgers had set the world lead a day before in a separate heat, but he did not start in the semi-finals. This left Lyles' primary rival to be Ronnie Baker, who had run the 100 m in 9.78 s at the Prefontaine Classic earlier that year, but with a wind velocity just over the allowable limit for record purposes (+2.4 m/s). In the final Baker got out a few meters ahead of Lyles out of the blocks, but Lyles started to come back halfway through the race and just passed Baker in the last meter to win in 9.88 s, a new world lead and personal best time for Lyles. He became the youngest U.S. champion in the 100 m since Sam Graddy won in 1984.

Lyles world lead in the 100 m would later be beaten by Baker (9.87 s) and then Christian Coleman (9.79 s), but at the Herculis IAAF Diamond League meet in Monaco Lyles set a new 200 m world lead and personal best time in 19.65 s. The time placed him in the top-10 fastest men in the 200 m of all time. Before that Lyles equaled his personal best and world lead at the Athletissima IAAF Diamond League meet to win a greatly anticipated showdown against Michael Norman, who had set the indoor world record in the 400-meter dash earlier that year. Lyles went into the IAAF Diamond League final, the Weltklasse Zürich, as the favorite. He was again matched up against world champion Ramil Guliyev who recently also become European champion, setting a personal best of 19.76 s in the process. The two were placed in adjacent lanes and ran evenly through the bend, but Lyles started to pull away on the straight and finished in 19.67 s. It was his fourth time under 19.70 s in the same season. Only one other individual has been under 19.70 s four times in a career, world record holder Usain Bolt who also did it four times during his record-breaking 2009 season.

2019
In 2019, Lyles opened the season by running 100 meters races, running a 9.86 (+0.9) world leader in Shanghai on May 18. In his first 200-meter race, at the Pietro Mennea Golden Gala meet, he equalled Mennea's long standing 1979 world record time running a 19.72 (+0.7). A month later at Athletissima in Lausanne, he dropped his personal best to 19.50 (−0.1) to move into the number four position on the all time list. A week later he ran a 9.92 (+0.3) 100 in Monaco. With the extended schedule in 2019, he ran the US National Championships at the end of July, taking the 200-meter title in 19.78 (−0.7) into a headwind in Des Moines. Then in Paris he ran 19.65 (+0.2).

Lyles won gold medals in the 200 m and the 4 × 100 m relay at the 2019 World Athletics Championships held in Doha, Qatar.

2021–present
On August 4, 2021, Lyles won a bronze medal at the 2020 Tokyo Olympics in the 200-meter men's final with a time of 19.74 seconds, equalling his season's best from the U.S. Olympic Trials earlier that year. He followed this Olympic performance with a 19.52 (+1.5) in Eugene, Oregon on August 21, which was his second best performance and the ninth fastest 200 m mark in history.

On July 21, 2022, during the World Athletics Championships on home soil in Eugene, Oregon, Lyles claimed his second global title in the 200 m and surpassed Michael Johnson's long standing record of 19.32 by running 19.31, which moved him to third on the world all-time list. He capped his fine season in the Zürich Diamond League final with victory in 200 m, securing his fourth Diamond Trophy over the distance and fifth overall. Lyles was undefeated in his specialist event that year, breaking 20 seconds in all 12 of his races, including heats and finals.

Achievements
Information from World Athletics profile unless otherwise noted.

Personal bests

International competitions

Circuit wins and titles
 Diamond League 100 m champion:  2019
 Diamond League 200 m champion:  2017,  2018,  2019,  2022
 200 metres wins, other events specified in parenthesis
 2017 (2): Shanghai Diamond League (= ), Brussels Memorial Van Damme
 2018 (5): Doha Diamond League ( PB), Eugene Prefontaine Classic (PB), Lausanne Athletissima (WL PB), Monaco Herculis (WL MR PB), Zürich Weltklasse
 2019 (5): Shanghai (100m, WL PB), Lausanne (WL MR PB), Paris Meeting (MR), Zürich (100m), Brussels
 2020 (1): Monaco (WL)
 2021 (1): Eugene (WL MR)
 2022 (4): Doha, Monaco (MR), Lausanne, Zürich (MR)

National championships

Season's bests
w = wind-assisted (wind velocity more than +2.0 m/s)

100 meters

World rank from World Athletics' Season Top Lists.

200 meters

World rank from World Athletics' Season Top Lists.

See also
 2018 in 100 metres
 2019 in 100 metres

Notes

References

External links

Videos
Noah Lyles Sprints to 200m Gold | World Athletics Championships 2019 | Doha Moments via World Athletics on YouTube
Noah Lyles breaks Usain Bolt's meeting record over 200m in Lausanne – IAAF Diamond League 2019 via the Diamond League on YouTube
Noah Lyles catches Christian Coleman at the line in the 100m at Shanghai – IAAF Diamond League 2019 via the Diamond League on YouTube
Noah Lyles Wins 100-Meter National Championship via Team USA on YouTube

 

1997 births
Living people
Sportspeople from Alexandria, Virginia
Track and field athletes from Virginia
American male sprinters
African-American male track and field athletes
Athletes (track and field) at the 2014 Summer Youth Olympics
World Athletics Championships athletes for the United States
World Athletics Championships medalists
World Athletics Championships winners
Diamond League winners
IAAF Continental Cup winners
USA Outdoor Track and Field Championships winners
USA Indoor Track and Field Championships winners
Youth Olympic gold medalists for the United States
Youth Olympic gold medalists in athletics (track and field)
T. C. Williams High School alumni
Athletes (track and field) at the 2020 Summer Olympics
Medalists at the 2020 Summer Olympics
Olympic bronze medalists for the United States in track and field
21st-century African-American sportspeople